"Sí" is a song by Danish DJ and producer Martin Jensen. It was released on 20 March 2015 as digital download by Disco:wax. The song has peaked to number 55 on the Swedish Singles Chart. The song is a remix of a Cristiano Ronaldo celebration at the 2014 FIFA Ballon d'Or, gained him a lot of popularity in many Latin countries.

Music video
A music video to accompany the release of "Sí" was first released onto YouTube on 5 July 2015 at a total length of two minutes and fifty-eight seconds.

Track listing

Charts

Weekly charts

Certifications

Release history

References

2015 songs
2015 singles
Martin Jensen songs